Massimo Graziato (born 25 September 1988) is an Italian former professional road cyclist, who rode professionally between 2012 and 2016 for the ,  and  squads.

Major results

2006
1st Prologue Tre Cicilista Bresciana
3rd Trofeo Buffoni
3rd Overall Kroz Istru
2009
1st Stage 2 Vuelta a Tenerife
4th Trofeo Edil C
4th Paris–Roubaix Espoirs
8th Coppa San Geo
2010
1st Trofeo Edil C
1st GP Città di Valeggio
2011
1st Stage 2 Giro del Friuli-Venezia Giulia
4th Trofeo Franco Balestra
2012
6th Rogaland GP

Grand Tour general classification results timeline

References

External links

Massimo Graziato profile at Lampre-ISD

1988 births
Living people
Italian male cyclists
Cyclists from the Province of Padua